The 2019–20 NZ Touring Cars Championship  (known for commercial reasons as the 2019–20 BNT V8s Championship) will be the twenty-first season of the series, and the fifth under the NZ Touring Cars name. The field consists of two classes racing on the same grid. Class one featured both V8ST and NZV8 TLX cars. Class two consisted of older NZV8 TL cars. There is also a third class run for vehicles ineligible for points. The series' defending champions are Jack Smith for Class One, and Justin Ashwell for the V8 Lites class (renamed from Class Two).

Teams and drivers 
All teams are based and registered in New Zealand.

Driver changes
Andre Heimgartner will return to the series to drive with Hamilton Motorsports. Chelsea Herbert was originally slated to drive with the team, but withdrew after announcing her plans to compete in the Toyota Racing Series.

Calendar 
The calendar was announced on April 30, 2019. The calendar was later revised, removing the South Island rounds citing issues surrounding cost.

References

External links

Touring Cars
Touring Cars
NZ Touring Cars Championship seasons